Vodnik is a bandy club from Arkhangelsk in Russia. Vodnik was founded in 1925. During the existence of the Soviet Union the club was a part of the Voluntary Sports Societies of the USSR Vodnik.

Vodnik became Russian champions in 1996 to begin a run of nine national championships in ten seasons, missing out only in the 2000–01 season when Yenisey scored the winning goal against them in the last minute. In the 2002 Bandy World Cup, Vodnik were the runner-ups after the Swedish club Sandvikens AIK, but won the tournament in 2003 and 2004. The team also won the European Cup in 2002, 2003 and 2004.

For the 2005–06 season almost all players left for Dynamo Moscow, when that club had qualified for the highest division again after a few seasons in the second tier.

In the last game of the regular 2016–17 Russian Bandy Super League season Vodnik played against Baykal-Energiya. The loss apparently would make Vodnik face a weaker team in the playoffs, therefore the team started to score own goals. Baykal-Energiya joined, apparently for fun. Vodnik won 11-9, with all goals scored in the game being own goals. The two teams are facing sanctions from the Russian Bandy Federation. The Federation banned coach Igor Gapanovich of Vodnik Arkhangelsk and coach Evgeny Erakhtin of Baykal-Energiya each for 30 months in March 2017, and fined each club 300,000 rubles (£4,100/$5,100/€4,800) for the teams scoring an aggregate of 20 goals in their own nets rather than their opponent’s to ensure they played against a convenient team in upcoming play-offs.

Honours

Domestic
 Russian Champions:
 Winners (9): 1996, 1997, 1998, 1999, 2000, 2002, 2003, 2004, 2005

Cup
 Russian Bandy Cup:
 Winners (6): 1992, 1994, 1995, 1996, 2000, 2005

International
 World Cup:
 Winners (2): 2003, 2004
 Runners-up (1): 2002
 European Cup:
 Winners (3): 2002, 2003, 2004
 Champions Cup:
 Winners (1): 2004

Vodnik-2
Vodnik's second team Vodnik-2 plays in the Russian Bandy Supreme League, the second tier of Russian bandy.

References

External links
ГАУ АО «Водник» - Главная Official team website
Водник Архангельск Site of Vodnik fans

Bandy clubs in Russia
Sport in Arkhangelsk
Bandy clubs established in 1925
1925 establishments in Russia